2007 Golden Globes may refer to:

 64th Golden Globe Awards, the Golden Globe Awards ceremony that took place in 2007
 65th Golden Globe Awards, the cancelled 2008 ceremony honoring the best in film and television for 2007
 2007 Golden Globes (Portugal)